Qazi Bolaghi (also Romanized as Qāzī Bolāghī; also known as Kazibaga, Qāzībagha, Qāẕī Bāghī, Qāzī Bāghī, and Qāẕī Bolāgh) is a village in Dast Jerdeh Rural District, Chavarzaq District, Tarom County, Zanjan Province, Iran. At the 2006 census, its population was 412, in 110 families.

References 

Populated places in Tarom County